Zhaoxin (Shanghai Zhaoxin Semiconductor Co., Ltd.;) is a fabless semiconductor company, created in 2013 as a joint venture between VIA Technologies and the Shanghai Municipal Government. The company manufactures x86-compatible desktop and laptop CPUs. The term Zhào xīn means million core. The processors are created mainly for the Chinese market: the venture is an attempt to reduce the Chinese dependence on foreign technology.

Background
Zhaoxin is a joint venture between VIA Technologies and the Shanghai Municipal Government. In 2021 it was reported that VIA has a 14.75% shareholding in the company. China has a domestic policy to "replace all foreign hardware and software from its public infrastructure with homegrown solutions" by 2023 (the so-called 3–5–2 policy). VIA holds a x86 licence which allows its subsidiaries to produce compatible microprocessors; this allows Zhaoxin to develop x86 computer chips.

Architecture
The architecture of the initial ZX family of processors is a continuation of VIA's Centaur Technology x86-64 Isaiah design. The ZX-A and ZX-B are based on the VIA Nano X2 C4350AL. The ZX-B is identical to the ZX-A, except that it is manufactured by Shanghai Huali Microelectronics Corporation (HLMC) . The ZX-C is based on the VIA QuadCore-E & Eden X4. Zhaoxin calls this architecture  "Zhangjiang", however it is thought that the basis is the VIA Isaiah 2 architecture. Like the VIA processors they were based on, early ZX processors were ball grid array chips sold pre-soldered onto a motherboard.

Zhaoxin came to the attention of the Northen American and European technology press when, in late 2017 and early 2018, it launched the ZX-D processor and revealed plans for future products. Zhaoxin calls the ZX-D architecture "Wudaokou"; this is a complete re-design of the VIA Isaiah. It is also a departure from earlier microarchitectures, such as ZhangJiang, which were a lightly modified version of a VIA Technologies (Centaur) architecture. WuDaoKou was a new and complete SoC design. Changes implemented in the ZX-D included the integration of a northbridge, like in modern x86 designs, as well as the addition of Chinese cryptographic functions. The ZX-D series also had an integrated graphics processing unit (iGPU) based on S3 Graphics technology (previously owned by VIA).

The former ZX naming was dropped around 2018 in favour of the KX ("KaiXian") designation for desktop processors and the KH ("KaisHeng") designation for server processors.

The successor to the ZX-D, the KX-6000 system on a chip (also called ZX-E), was demonstrated to the press in September 2018. The architecture, an evolution of the ZX-D architecture, was called "Lujiazui". The KX-6000 was formally launched in 2019. In June 2019 the KX-6000 was reported to being built on a 16 nm TSMC process. The chip has a DirectX 11.1 compatible iGPU. In 2022, Zhaoxin was noted to have added ZX-E specific compiler support for the GNU Compiler Collection.

The successor to the KX-6000, the ZX-F or KX-7000 processor series, was initially planned for release in 2021. As of December 2022 there had been no launch and no further announcements about the processors, however. The KX-7000 chip was planned to be released on a 7 nm process with DDR5 support.

Discrete GPU
In 2020 Zhaoxin announced it was planning to release a dedicated graphics card.

Summary of architecture

Uses
Zhaoxin processors have mainly been used for Chinese laptops.

Performance
The Zhaoxin ZX-C+ 4701 CPU was reviewed in 2020, and showed significantly worse performance against older Intel (i5 2500K) and AMD (Athlon 3000G) processors. The ZX-D was noted to have roughly the performance of the Intel Silvermont (Avoton) processors (which were launched in 2013).

The ZX-E / KX-6000 is reported to have a 50% performance increase over the KX-5000, and comparable performance to a 7th generation Intel i5 core processor from 2016 (namely the Core i5-7400). The 8-core ZX-E U6780A was reviewed by Linus Tech Tips in August 2020. The review processor was benchmarked to be slightly slower than a 3rd generation Intel i5 quad-core processor (originally released in 2012–2013) using Cinebench. Gaming performance was noted to be poor, whilst the machine itself was noted to be expensive for its performance by 2020 standards. Tom's Hardware also reviewed the U6780A and reported poor gaming performance in 2020.

The aim for the ZX-F series is for performance parity with the 2018 series Ryzen processors (i.e. the AMD Zen+ microarchitecture, the predecessor to AMD Zen 2).

See also
Semiconductor industry
Semiconductor industry in China
 AMD–Chinese joint venture
 Loongson
 FeiTeng (processor)
 Sunway (processor)
 :Category:Microprocessors made in China

References

Notes

External links
 Zhaoxin homepage
 WikiChip article on Zhaoxin

VIA Technologies x86 microprocessors
Microprocessors made in China
Technology companies established in 2013
Technology companies of China
Companies based in Shanghai
Fabless semiconductor companies